Cadence13 (formerly DGital Media Inc.) is a media company based in New York City that creates, distributes, and monetizes audio content, primarily podcasts. The company was founded in 2015 and is a division of Audacy, Inc. The company is helmed by chief executive officer Spencer Brown, Chief Content Officer Chris Corcoran and President John Murphy. It is a major podcasting network and has produced podcasts for actor Joseph Gordon-Levitt, reality star Lauren Conrad, journalist Neil Strauss, and author Rachel Hollis. Cadence13 has partnerships with several other companies, including Goop, Crooked Media, and Tenderfoot TV.

Background and history
David Landau and Spencer Brown worked together as co-CEOs for Westwood One and in 2015 founded Cadence13 as DGital Media, alongside venture capitalist Michael Rolnick. In 2017, Entercom purchased a 45 percent stake in DGital Media for $9.7 million.

In 2018, Cadence13 teamed up with the United Talent Agency to create Ramble, the "first podcast network devoted exclusively to online creators".

In April 2019, Cadence13 announced that it would be starting C13Originals, under which the company would release several new podcast shows featuring unscripted audio stories. The first C13Originals show released was Gangster Capitalism. In July 2019, a partnership was announced between Cadence13 and Nielsen Holdings, with Cadence13 being one of the first few companies under the Nielsen Podcast Listener Buying Power Service. On August 7, 2019, it was announced that broadcasting company Entercom had entered into an agreement with Cadence13 and Pineapple Street Media to acquire the companies.

Cadence13 was named one of Fast Company's "World's Most Innovative Companies for 2019".

In March 2020, Cadence13 announced that they would be launching a podcast with former presidential candidate Andrew Yang, titled Yang Speaks.

List of podcasts

| width="50%" align="left" valign="top" style="border:0"|
4D with Demi Lovato
America Dissected
Asking for a Friend
The Ballad of Billy Balls/The RFK Tapes Podcast
Black History Year
Blockbuster: The Story of James Cameron
Boardroom: Out of Office
Campaign HQ with David Plouffe
Clear Eyes, Full Hearts: A Friday Night Lights Rewatch Podcast
Club Shay Shay
Comments by Celebs
Cover-Up
Culpable
Daily Breath with Deepak Chopra
The Daily Punch
The Dale Jr. Download
David Ortiz: The Big Papi Story
Dead and Gone
Deepak Chopra's Infinite Potential
Deux U
The Edge
The ETCs with Kevin Durant
Everything Happens
First Things First
Fly on the Wall with Dana Carvey and David Spade
Forward
Gadget Lab Podcast
Gaining Ground: The New Georgia
The GM Shuffle
The Goop Podcast 
Happier in Hollywood
Happier with Gretchen Rubin
Hope Through History
Hysteria
In the Limelight
Inside the Hive
Jill on Money
Keep It!
Little Gold Men
The Long Shot with Duncan Robinson and Davis Reid
Lovett or Leave It
| width="50%" align="left" valign="top" style="border:0"|
No F*cks Given
The Moment with Brian Koppelman
The Old Man and the Three
Origins with James Andrew Miller
Psychobabble
Pull Up with CJ McCollum
Pulling the Thread with Elise Loehnen
The Punies by Kobe Bryant
The Rachel Hollis Podcast
Radio Rental
Rise Together with Dave Hollis
She Rates Dogs
Side Hustle School
Skip and Shannon: Undisputed
Speak for Yourself
Sports Media with Richard Deitsch
Still Watching
Straight Up with Trent Shelton
Tell Me with Ellen Pompeo
This Land
The Tony Kornheiser Show
To Live and Die in L.A.
Unsolved Mysteries
Up and Vanished
VIEWS
What Really Happened?
We Can Do Hard Things with Glennon Doyle
What's in Your Glass? with Carmelo Anthony
Whirlwind
Whistleblower
The Wilderness
With Friends Like These
Women Who Travel
Yoga Girl: Conversations from the Heart
Yoga Girl Daily
You Must Remember This
Zack to the Future

C13Originals
Fallen Angel
Fate of Fact
Gangster Capitalism
Gone South
Hope, Through History
It Was Said
It Was Said: Sports
Long May They Run
No Place Like Home
Once Upon a Time...
One Click
Relative Unknown

Ramble
A Hot Dog is a Sandwich
Anything Goes with Emma Chamberlain
CHARLI AND DIXIE: 2 CHIX
Ear Biscuits
Guilty Pleasures
Marc & Heidi - The Other D'Amelios
Pretty Basic with Alisha Marie and Remi Cruz
Queerified with Gigi Gorgeous & Mimi
Rotten Mango
SmoshCast
The TryPod
Trevor Talks Too Much
You Can Sit With Us

References

Audacy, Inc.
Podcasting companies